Kekkaishi is a shōnen fantasy manga written and illustrated by Yellow Tanabe. It was serialized in the weekly Japanese manga magazine Weekly Shōnen Sunday from 2003 issue 47 to 2011 issue 19. Serial chapters have been collected in tankōbon volumes by Shogakukan, with the first released on 18 February 2004, all 35 volumes completed with the last volume published on 18 August 2011. The series is about teenagers Yoshimori Sumimura and Tokine Yukimura, heirs to rival clans of kekkai (barrier magic) users, who must defend their school from the spirits drawn to the sacred land it is built upon. Kekkaishi received the 2007 Shogakukan Manga Award for shōnen manga.

Viz Media announced in April 2005 that they had acquired the rights to translate and distribute Kekkaishi in North America. Viz released volume one on 3 May 2005, the 35th and last volume is scheduled to release on 11 December 2012. In July 2009, Viz announced the creation of their new imprint Shonen Sunday, which Kekkaishi would be moved under, and the launching of a dedicated website where individual chapters of Kekkaishi and other Shonen Sunday series are now being serialized. It is also licensed in France by Pika Édition, in Germany by Carlsen Comics, in Hong Kong by Rightman Publishing Limited, in Indonesia by Elex Media Komputindo which serializes it in Shōnen Star, in Italy by Planet Manga, in Malaysia by PCM Comics, in South Korea by Bookbox, in Spain by Editorial Ivrea, in Taiwan by Tong Li Comics, and in Vietnam by Kim Dong.

Kekkaishi has been adapted into a 52-episode anime series by Sunrise, which was broadcast on Nippon Television, Yomiuri TV, and Nippon News Network between 16 October 2006 and 12 February 2008. It has also been adapted into three video games.

Chapter and volume list
Note: This list uses Viz's official English-translated titles through volume 32, unofficial Japanese translations thereafter.

See also
 List of Kekkaishi episodes
 List of Kekkaishi characters

References

External links
 Shōnen Sunday official manga website 
 Viz Media official manga site
 

Kekkaishi